Kristoffer James Porter is a Filipino professional basketball player for the Converge FiberXers of the Philippine Basketball Association (PBA). He was selected 16th overall in the 2018 PBA draft.

PBA career statistics

As of the end of 2022–23 season

Season-by-season averages

|-
| align=left | 
| align=left | NLEX
| 9 || 15.9 || .341 || .227 || .667 || 3.6 || 1.8 || .3 || .1 || 4.8
|-
| align=left | 
| align=left | NLEX
| 8 || 21.4 || .386 || .444 || .800 || 3.6 || .3 || .8 || .0 || 6.3
|-
| align=left rowspan=2| 
| align=left | NLEX
| rowspan=2|17 || rowspan=2|15.7 || rowspan=2|.375 || rowspan=2|.067 || rowspan=2|.786 || rowspan=2|1.6 || rowspan=2|.5 || rowspan=2|.1 || rowspan=2|.1 || rowspan=2|3.5
|-
| align=left | Phoenix
|-
| align=left | 
| align=left | Phoenix
| 9 || 7.7 || .353 || .500 || .750 || .4 || .3 || .2 || .0 || 1.8
|-class=sortbottom
| align=center colspan=2 | Career
| 43 || 15.1 || .367 || .263 || .750 || 2.2 || .7 || .3 || .1 || 3.9

References

1994 births
Living people
Ateneo Blue Eagles men's basketball players
Centers (basketball)
Maharlika Pilipinas Basketball League players
NLEX Road Warriors draft picks
NLEX Road Warriors players
Place of birth missing (living people)
Power forwards (basketball)
Phoenix Super LPG Fuel Masters players